USS Chewink is a name the U.S. Navy has used more than once in naming its warships:

 , launched 21 December 1918 by Todd Shipyard Corp., New York City.
 , originally LCI(L)-701; renamed and reclassified on 7 March 1952.

References 
 

United States Navy ship names